Samuel Martin (1 September 1714 – 20 November 1788) was an Antiguan-born politician, administrator and plantation owner.

Family
He was born on the West Indies island of Antigua, the son of Samuel Martin, the leading plantation owner on the island. He had three notable half-brothers: Sir Henry Martin, 1st Baronet (1733–1794), for many years naval commissioner at Portsmouth and Comptroller of the Navy, and the father of Thomas Byam Martin; Josiah Martin (1737–1786), Governor of North Carolina from 1771 and William Byam Martin, a merchant and official of the East India Company who returned to England as wealthy nabob. His full-sister Henrietta (Rilla) Fitzgerald was the mother of poet William Thomas Fitzgerald and mother-in-law of equity lawyer John Fonblanque KC MP for Camelford 1802–1806. Martin's will seems to reveal the existence of the mother of his natural child or children.

Parliament
Martin sat as Member of Parliament (MP) for the Cornish borough of Camelford from 1747 until 1768. He was a protégé of an important British politician, Henry Bilson Legge, who was three times Chancellor of the Exchequer. When Legge was first made Chancellor, Martin served as his secretary from April 1754 until November 1755.

Martin, although he lacked major political talents and was mistrusted by Thomas Pelham-Holles, 1st Duke of Newcastle, had a capacity for hard work and dealing with administration. This led to his being appointed Secretary to the Treasury for the first time in November 1756, during Legge's second Chancellorship. This was a post which was more administrative than political in nature, although Martin was an MP and the appointment was a patronage one. In April 1757 he left office together with his political allies, led by William Pitt the Elder.

When Legge was restored to the Chancellorship for the third time in July 1757, Martin was the only person who had gone out of office in April who was not given a new job in the Pitt-Newcastle Coalition. Having failed to obtain an office in the King's service, Martin was compensated by being appointed Treasurer to the Princess Dowager of Wales Augusta of Saxe-Gotha (mother of the future King George III of the United Kingdom) in October 1757, an office he retained until 8 February 1772. In 1760 King George III succeeded to the throne and Martin was able in the following year to transfer his political loyalty from Legge (who was becoming less prominent in public life) to the King's favourite John Stuart, 3rd Earl of Bute.

In April 1758 Martin became Secretary to the Treasury for the second time and continued in that office until April 1763. After leaving the Treasury in 1763, Martin largely withdrew from public life. He declined to seek re-election to Parliament in 1768, unless the government paid all his election expenses. Although this proposal was not accepted, he was returned again for Hastings until 1774.

Duel with John Wilkes

The Times of Wednesday 26 November 1788 reported:  "Last week died Samuel Martin Esq
 a gentleman well known in the political world and particularly from his having fought a duel about five and twenty years ago with Mr Wilkes".  
This pistol duel took place in Hyde Park on 16 November 1763. John Wilkes was severely wounded in the stomach, ultimately fled to Paris and was pronounced an outlaw.

References

Oxford Dictionary of National Biography, the article about his father Samuel Martin (of Antigua), includes a section on the subject of this article.
The House of Commons 1754-1790, by Sir Lewis Namier and John Brooke (HMSO 1964)

1714 births
1788 deaths
Antigua and Barbuda people of British descent
Members of the Parliament of Great Britain for English constituencies
Members of the Parliament of Great Britain for constituencies in Cornwall
British MPs 1747–1754
British MPs 1754–1761
British MPs 1761–1768
British MPs 1768–1774
British duellists